The 2018–19 Davidson Wildcats men's basketball team represented Davidson College during the 2018–19 NCAA Division I men's basketball season. The Wildcats were led by 30th-year head coach Bob McKillop and played their home games at the John M. Belk Arena in Davidson, North Carolina as fifth-year members of the Atlantic 10 Conference. The Wildcats finished the season 24–10, 14–4 to finish as runners-up in the Atlantic 10 regular season. They defeated Saint Joseph's in the quarterfinals of the A-10 tournament before losing to Saint Louis in the semifinals. They received an at-large bid to the National Invitation Tournament as a No. 4 seed, where they lost to Lipscomb in the first round.

Previous season
The Wildcats finished the 2017–18 season 21–12, 13–5 in the A-10 to finish in third place. In the A-10 tournament they defeated Saint Louis, St. Bonaventure, and Rhode Island to be A-10 Tournament champions. They received the A-10's automatic bid to the NCAA tournament where they lost in the first round to Kentucky.

Offseason

Departures

2018 recruiting class

Source

Roster

Schedule and results

|-
!colspan=9 style=| Exhibition

|-
!colspan=9 style=| Non-conference regular season

|-
!colspan=9 style=| A-10 regular season

|-
!colspan=9 style=| A-10 tournament

|-
!colspan=9 style=|NIT

References

Davidson Wildcats men's basketball seasons
Davidson
Davidson Wildcats men's basketball
Davidson Wildcats men's basketball
Davidson